The 2019–20 National League season was the 82nd season of Swiss professional ice hockey and the third season as the National League (NL).

ZSC Lions won the regular season, defeating EV Zug in the final round of matches.

SC Bern were the defending champions and three-time defending regular season winners, however for the second consecutive year the defending champion failed to make the playoffs.

Due to the 2018–19 league qualification series not being contested, the participating teams remained the same as the previous season.

The season was affected by the 2020 coronavirus outbreak in Switzerland, with the final two rounds of regular season games taking place without crowds, and the start of the playoffs postponed. On March 12, the National League committee announced that the playoffs would be cancelled, due to the ban on sporting events in the canton of Ticino.

Teams

Regular season

Player statistics

Scoring leaders

The following players led the league in points, at the conclusion of the regular season. If two or more skaters are tied (i.e. same number of points, goals and played games), all of the tied skaters are shown.

Leading goaltenders
The following goaltenders led the league in goals against average, provided that they have played at least 40% of their team's minutes, at the conclusion of the regular season.

Playoffs

Relegation playoffs – Playouts

Ranking round

Venues
This is Lausanne HC's first season in the Vaudoise Aréna, replacing Patinoire de Malley where they played from 1984 to 2017 and two seasons from 2017 to 2019 in the temporary 6,700-seat Malley 2.0. The team played its first regular-season game in the new venue on September 24, 2019, against Genève-Servette HC.

This is HC Fribourg-Gottéron's final season in the under-renovation BCF Arena. Starting with the 2020–21 season, the arena will have been completely renovated and the seating capacity will have shifted from 6,500 to 8,500.

References

External links
 
 

1
Swiss
National League (ice hockey) seasons
NL